The 2016–17 VFF National Super League is the qualifying competition for the 2018 OFC Champions League.

The 14 teams will be split into two groups of five and one group of four, with the top two from each group qualifying for final round. The winner of the final round will qualify for the 2018 OFC Champions League.

Teams
14 teams will qualify from 8 separate national competitions.

Group stage

Group A

Group B

Group C

Final round

Grand final
The 2017 VFF National Super League Grand Final was played between two teams:
Nalkutan, the 2016 VFF National Super League champions
Erakor Golden Star, the 2017 Port Vila Top Four Super League winners.

Both teams had already qualified for the 2018 OFC Champions League by winning their respective competitions. The Grand Final decided the seeding of the two teams in the 2018 OFC Champions League, with the winner seeded as Vanuatu 1 and the runner-up seeded as Vanuatu 2.

References

2016 in Oceanian association football leagues
2017 in Oceanian association football leagues
VFF National Super League seasons
2016–17 in Vanuatuan football